Clarita Elizabeth Hartley, OBE (1 February 1906 – March 1996) was active in the Girl Guiding movement both in the United Kingdom and internationally.

Hartley joined the Guiding movement as a Guider in 1925. She was a Guider-in-Charge at Foxlease and also held numerous committee positions at a national level within the Girl Guide Association (now Girlguiding UK). 

Hartley was a volunteer with the Guide International Service, working in post-war Germany.

In 1969 she was vice-chair of the WAGGGS' 20th World Conference in Finland. She was awarded the Silver Fish. Hartley succeeded Mona Burgin as leader of the Training Team of the World Association Training scheme. Hartley authored several works about Guiding.

Works
1963: Not More than Eight
1968: A Handbook for Commissioners
1975: Olave Baden-Powell

See also

Olave Baden-Powell
Alice Behrens
Alix Liddell

References

1906 births
1996 deaths
Girl Guiding and Girl Scouting
Recipients of the Silver Fish Award